APCR may refer to:

 Armour-Piercing Composite Rigid - a type of armor piercing projectile
 Association for Protection of Civil Rights - a non-governmental organization
 Activated protein C resistance - a hemostatic disorder